Saif Badar (born 3 July 1998) is a Pakistani cricketer. He made his List A debut on 19 April 2016 for Punjab in the 2016 Pakistan Cup. He made his first-class debut for Khan Research Laboratories in the 2017–18 Quaid-e-Azam Trophy on 26 September 2017. He made his Twenty20 debut for Peshawar in the 2017–18 National T20 Cup on 18 November 2017.

In September 2019, he was named in Southern Punjab's squad for the 2019–20 Quaid-e-Azam Trophy tournament. In November 2019, he was named in Pakistan's squad for the 2019 ACC Emerging Teams Asia Cup in Bangladesh.

References

External links
 

1998 births
Living people
Pakistani cricketers
Khan Research Laboratories cricketers
Lahore Qalandars cricketers
Multan Sultans cricketers
Peshawar cricketers
Punjab (Pakistan) cricketers
Sindh cricketers
Cricketers from Sialkot
Southern Punjab (Pakistan) cricketers